Pompeo Massani (Florence, December, 1850  – 1920) was an Italian painter who mainly depicted costume genre subjects, often in satirical poses.

Biography
He studied at the Academy of Fine Arts of Florence, then studied for three years under Michele Gordigiani. His first important work was the painting: La politica in canonica, awarded a silver medal at the Exhibition of Rovigo of 1879. In 1881 he won the first prize at the Exhibition of Genoa, for the painting: Un brindisi al frate, depicting over 36 figures; The Design Lesson, owned by the Goupil Gallery, and I vecchi celibi; ; Il concerto; In cantina; and Il saluto al gobbo. The made portraits of King Vittorio Emanuele and of the Countess of Mirafiore.

Massani painted on tambourines, depicting lively public scenes, including Al teatro delle Marionette,  Al circo equestre; Al teatrino; Il giocoliere, e Momento allegro.  At the Exhibition of Monaco of 1889, he displayed il Circo equestre. La poesia is a canvas with five figures titled: La politica, che sta per terminare.

Massani was named honorary professor of the Royal Academy of Fine Arts of Florence. In 1887, he was awarded Cross of the Knight of the Order of the Crown of Italy.

He often painted elderly individuals engaged in apparent buffoonery or celebrating inebriation.

Gallery

References

1850 births
1920 deaths
19th-century Italian painters
Italian male painters
20th-century Italian painters
Italian genre painters
Italian costume genre painters
Painters from Florence
Accademia di Belle Arti di Firenze alumni
19th-century Italian male artists
20th-century Italian male artists